Charles Mariano Aránguiz Sandoval (born 17 April 1989) is a Chilean professional footballer who plays as a midfielder for Bundesliga club Bayer Leverkusen and the Chile national team.

With his former club Universidad de Chile, Aránguiz was considered one of the best midfielders in the Chilean Primera División, with a good sense of tactics, impressive stamina and intelligent playmaking, marking and passing abilities. He can play as a defensive, center or even as a right wing midfielder. He is described by FIFA's official website as "a crafty, tigerish midfielder of the highest order, notable for his ability to win and distribute the ball, pick out passes and hit the back of the net".

Club career

Early life
Aránguiz was born in Puente Alto in Diego Portales neighborhood. His mother, Mariana Sandoval, is a football coach. He started to play football in Universidad de Chile before leaving the club to join Cobreloa Academy when he was 13 years old.

Early career

Aránguiz made his professional debut in 2006, for Cobreloa against Cobresal. His first goal in the Primera División was against O'Higgins in the same year. After a spell on loan at Cobresal, Aránguiz joined Colo-Colo, where he won the Clausura championship in 2009.

In 2010, Aránguiz had a short spell at Argentine club Quilmes, before joining Colo-Colo's historic rivals Universidad de Chile for a fee of £616,000 on 1 January 2011. He immediately became an integral part of the squad, helping "U" to win the 2011 Copa Sudamericana, where the Chilean team remained unbeaten for the entire tournament. By defeating Ecuadorian side Liga de Quito 4–0 on aggregate in the final, Universidad de Chile became the first Chilean side to win a continental competition in twenty years.

Having drawn 3–3 on aggregate with Unión Española in the semi-finals of the Copa Chile, Aránguiz led his team to the final, netting the "U"'s first kick in a 5–4 penalty shoot-out victory on 17 April 2013. In the final, he played the full ninety minutes as Universidad secured a 2–1 win over Universidad Católica thanks to a stoppage-time goal from Juan Ignacio Duma.

Internacional
On 11 January 2014, it was announced that Aránguiz was signed by Brazilian club Internacional on loan until 15 August 2014 from Granada, after its owner Giampaolo Pozzo, who also owns Udinese and Watford, had bought half of his rights from Universidad de Chile. Although he never played for the Spanish club, as he was quickly loaned to the Brazilian club and later sold.

He was named the MVP of the 2014 Campeonato Gaúcho as Internacional won the tournament for a record 43rd time.

On 11 June 2014, Charles Aránguiz's purchase was announced by Internacional's board in a joint transaction with investor Delcir Sonda for an undisclosed fee. Aránguiz signed a new contract which expires in June 2018.

Bayer Leverkusen
On 13 August 2015, Bayer Leverkusen announced that they had signed Aránguiz from Internacional for an undisclosed fee thought to be around £8.6m. He was given the number 20 shirt. Aranguiz was the subject of a fierce transfer battle between Bayer and Leicester City and despite the latter offering him a significantly higher salary, Aranguiz opted to move to Bayer Leverkusen. Aranguiz stated that Leicester was a small club and that he wanted to play in the Champions League. Aránguiz was appointed as club captain ahead of the 2020–21 season, after Lars Bender abdicated the role due to ongoing injury issues.

International career

He participated in Milk Cup in 2007. In 2008, he participated in Toulon Tournament, Milk Cup, and the Talents Cup. Along with Chile youth team he won the 2008 João Havelange Tournament. He participated for the U-20 Chile team in 2009 South American Youth Championship; there he scored one goal in the championship from a free kick.

Aránguiz made his debut for the Chile national team in 2009, but was not selected for the 2010 FIFA World Cup or the 2011 Copa América. He established himself in the Chile team during its successful 2014 FIFA World Cup qualification campaign, making seven appearances and scoring in wins against Bolivia and Venezuela.

On 1 June 2014, Aránguiz was named to Chile's final 23-man roster for the 2014 FIFA World Cup in Brazil. In Chile's second group match against defending champions Spain at the Estádio do Maracanã, he provided the assist for Eduardo Vargas's goal before scoring himself as Chile eliminated Spain and secured qualification to the round of 16.

At the 2015 Copa América, held in Chile, Aránguiz scored twice during a 5–0 defeat of Bolivia which ensured that La Roja would progress to the knockout stage as Group A winners.

The following year, Aránguiz was once again a key player for Chile in their 2016 Copa América Centenario triumph. Aránguiz scored the crucial opening goal against Colombia in Chile's 2–0 semi-final victory over them. He then also played great in the final against Argentina and he converted a vital penalty in the penalty shoot-out which gave Chile victory once again against Argentina. Chile raised the Copa America trophy with this triumph and Aránguiz was a key player for them throughout the tournament.

Personal life
His mother, Mariana Sandoval, was a football coach and leader at amateur level for over 30 years in Puente Alto and was highlighted by CONMEBOL due to these contributions. 

His brother, Gilberto, is a football coach working for club Municipal Puente Alto in the Chilean Tercera B during 2022.

His cousin, Mario Sandoval, is a professional football player too.

Career statistics

Club

International

Scores and results list Chile's goal tally first, score column indicates score after each Aránguiz goal.

Honours
Colo-Colo
Primera División de Chile: 2009 Clausura

Universidad de Chile
Copa Sudamericana: 2011
Primera División de Chile: 2011 Apertura, 2011 Clausura, 2012 Apertura
Copa Chile: 2012–13
Recopa Sudamericana runner-up: 2012
Supercopa de Chile runner-up: 2013

Internacional
Campeonato Gaúcho: 2014, 2015

Chile
Copa del Pacífico: 2012
Copa América: 2015, 2016

Individual
Copa Sudamericana's Ideal Team: 2012, 2013
America's Ideal Team: 2012
Copa América Team of the Tournament: 2016

References

External links

1989 births
Living people
People from Puente Alto
Chilean people of Basque descent
Chilean footballers
Chilean expatriate footballers
Chile international footballers
Chile under-20 international footballers
Chile youth international footballers
Cobreloa footballers
Cobresal footballers
Udinese Calcio players
Colo-Colo footballers
Quilmes Atlético Club footballers
Universidad de Chile footballers
Sport Club Internacional players
Bayer 04 Leverkusen players
Chilean Primera División players
Serie A players
Argentine Primera División players
Campeonato Brasileiro Série A players
Bundesliga players
Expatriate footballers in Italy
Expatriate footballers in Argentina
Expatriate footballers in Brazil
Expatriate footballers in Germany
Chilean expatriate sportspeople in Italy
Chilean expatriate sportspeople in Argentina
Chilean expatriate sportspeople in Brazil
Chilean expatriate sportspeople in Germany
2014 FIFA World Cup players
2015 Copa América players
Copa América Centenario players
2017 FIFA Confederations Cup players
2019 Copa América players
2021 Copa América players
Copa América-winning players
Association football midfielders